Valentine Ruth Henshall (born 7 March 1967), known professionally as Ruthie Henshall, is an English actress, singer and dancer, known for her work in musical theatre. She began her professional stage career in 1986, before making her West End debut in Cats in 1987. A five-time Olivier Award nominee, she won the 1995 Olivier Award for Best Actress in a Musical for her role as Amalia Balash in the London revival of She Loves Me (1994).

Henshall's other Olivier nominated roles are Polly Baker in the original London production of Crazy for You (1993–1994), Roxie Hart in the revival of Chicago (1997–1998) and the title roles in the original productions of Peggy Sue Got Married (2001) and Marguerite (2008). She made her Broadway debut in 1999 as Velma Kelly in Chicago and returned to the Broadway production to play Roxie Hart in 2010. She also starred as Mrs Wilkinson for two years in the West End production of Billy Elliot the Musical (2014–2016). She returned to television acting in 2021 by appearing as Miranda Evans in the BBC soap opera Doctors.

Early and personal life
Henshall was born on 7 March 1967 in Orpington, London. Her father, David, was a journalist, later the editor of the East Anglian Daily Times, a Suffolk morning newspaper. Henshall once dated Prince Edward for a number of years, before becoming engaged to actor John Gordon Sinclair. After she took the role of Velma Kelly in Chicago on Broadway, they broke up. She met actor and singer Tim Howar, her male co-star lead in the West End production of Peggy Sue Got Married. The couple married in 2004 and have two daughters, Lily and Dolly. The couple separated in August 2009 and later divorced in January 2010.

Career
Prior to making her stage debut at the age of 19, Henshall trained at Laine Theatre Arts in Epsom, Surrey. Her debut performance was in the Cascade Revue at the West Cliff Theatre in Clacton-on-Sea. In the late 1980s and early 1990s, she took part in a touring production of A Chorus Line as Maggie. Her West End debut came shortly thereafter when she was cast in Cats, making appearances as Jemima, Demeter, Griddlebone and Grizabella.

In 1988, at the age of 21, Henshall was cast in Miss Saigon as one of the bargirls, showing at the Theatre Royal, Drury Lane. She then went on to originate the role of Aphra in Children of Eden at the Prince Edward Theatre. The summer of 1989 saw her at the Chichester Festival Theatre performing in plays by Shakespeare, Molière as well as a role in the musical Valentine's Day, based on You Can Never Tell by George Bernard Shaw.

In 1992, at the age of 25, Henshall was cast as Fantine in Les Misérables. Her first starring role came in the 1993 trans-Atlantic transfer of the Broadway production Crazy for You which opened at the Prince Edward Theatre. Her performance earned her the first of five Olivier Award nominations. In 1995, Henshall starred in She Loves Me, winning the Olivier as Best Actress in a Musical. That same year, she performed a concert of Gershwin songs at London's Royal Festival Hall. Later, in October, she recreated her role of Fantine for the 10th Anniversary Concert performance of Les Misérables at the Royal Albert Hall. In 1996, she took on the role of Nancy in producer Cameron Mackintosh's hit revival of Oliver! at the London Palladium. In 1997, Henshall originated the role of Roxie Hart in the West End transfer of the Broadway revival of Chicago. For this role, she received her third Olivier nomination for Best Actress in a Musical, which went to her co-star Ute Lemper.

Henshall was cast in the title role of the stage musical adaptation of the Francis Ford Coppola film Peggy Sue Got Married, which opened in London in August 2001 to mixed reviews. Although it closed after a run of just eight weeks, she was once again nominated for a Laurence Olivier Award for her performance.

Henshall has also appeared at the Chichester Festival Theatre, has toured Britain in the revue The Magnificent Musicals, and has performed in Hey, Mr. Producer!, a celebration of the works of Cameron Mackintosh. Her solo recordings include The Ruthie Henshall Album, Pilgrim, and Love Is Here to Stay, a collection of Gershwin tunes. She succeeded the role of Marian Halcombe from Maria Friedman in Andrew Lloyd Webber's The Woman in White, from July 2005 until February 2006. She was also cast in the title role in Marguerite, a new musical from the pens of Michel Legrand, Herbert Kretzmer, Alain Boublil and Claude-Michel Schönberg. The show opened on 7 May 2008 at the Theatre Royal Haymarket, London, but closed early on 13 September 2008.

Henshall's Broadway credits include Stephen Sondheim's Putting It Together, Chicago (as both Velma and Roxie), and off-Broadway The Vagina Monologues. In 2000 she guest-starred in an episode of Law & Order titled "Panic"; she played an author named P.K. Todd. Her first feature film, a musical version of A Christmas Carol with Kelsey Grammer, aired on NBC in the United States in November 2004 and was released as a commercial attraction to theatres in the UK and Europe. In January 2006 she appeared in the four-part BBC Television series The Sound of Musicals.

In 2008, Henshall replaced Natalia Bestemianova as a judge on the ITV1 show Dancing on Ice alongside Robin Cousins, Karen Barber, Nicky Slater and Jason Gardiner. Her appointment to The Ice Panel caused some controversy as she was the only judge with no experience in ice skating. She returned for a second series in 2009. Following the conclusion of the 2009 series, Henshall said on Angela and Friends the Sky1 TV programme that she was glad that she was away from Dancing on Ice. Her replacement for the 2010 series was Emma Bunton.

Henshall performed two evening concerts with Kim Criswell entitled From Broadway to Hollywood at London's Cadogan Hall in the summer of 2009.

She returned to the role of Roxie in Chicago at the Cambridge Theatre, London, on 14 December 2009 and completed her run on 24 April 2010. This was the second time Henshall played the role in London, having created it in 1997. She stated in an interview that she felt more comfortable in the part the second time around, being in her forties. She has stated that, "Anyone who plays the role of Roxie should be in their forties, as they have lived and learned". She has also recently played Roxie in the Broadway company of Chicago.

In March 2011, Henshall took the role of Elvira in the classic play Blithe Spirit in the West End, after playing the role in several regional theatre engagements.

In 2011 she also appeared as a theatre actor in an episode of the HBO comedy Curb Your Enthusiasm that aired 14 August, as well as a lawyer in The Case, a 5-part legal drama that aired from 31 October to 4 November on BBC One.

In February 2012 it was announced that Henshall will headline a concert of Side by Side by Sondheim in Australia. Henshall took a purely acting role as billionaire Stephanie Gaunt in the CBBC series Wizards vs Aliens in 2012. Henshall and Daniel Bowling (director of musicals) have written a book, So You Want to Be in Musicals?, published in 2012. In 2014, it was announced that she would play Mrs Wilkinson in Billy Elliot the Musical from 12 May. After two years in the production, she became the final actress to take on the role before the show's closure.

In 2020, it was confirmed that Henshall would be participating in the twentieth series of I'm a Celebrity...Get Me Out of Here. She was eliminated on 29 November, finishing in 11th place. In March 2021, she began appearing in the BBC soap opera Doctors as Miranda Evans.

In 2022, Henshall starred in the revival of Stephen Sondheim and James Lapine's musical Passion at the Hope Mill Theatre in Manchester, playing Fosca.

Filmography

Stage credits
 A Chorus Line (UK tour, 1987) as Maggie
 Cats (London cast, 1987–1989) as Jemima, Demeter, Jellyorum, Griddlebone, Grizabella
 Bernadette (Concept album, 1989) Performer
 Miss Saigon (Original London cast, 1989–1990) as Bar Girl, Ellen
 Children of Eden (Original London cast, 1991) as Aphra
 Henry VIII (Chichester Festival Theater, 1991) as Lady in Waiting
 The Sisterhood (Chichester cast, 1991) as Martine
 Valentine's Day (Chichester cast, 1991) as Mabel
 Follow the Star (Chichester Festival Theatre, 1991–1992) as Mary
 Les Misérables (London cast, 1992) as Fantine
 Godspell (Studio cast, 1993) Performer
 Crazy for You (Original London cast, 1993–1994) as Polly Baker
 She Loves Me (London revival cast, 1994) as Amalia Balash
 Annie (Studio cast, 1995) Performer
 Miss Saigon (Studio cast, 1995) as Ellen
 Les Misérables (London concert cast, 1995) as Fantine
 Crazy for You (Toronto cast) as Polly Baker
 Oliver! (London cast, 1996) as Nancy
 Divorce Me, Darling! (Chichester Festival cast, 1997) as Polly Brockhurst
 Chicago (London and Broadway revival cast, 1997–1998, 1999, 2010) as Roxie Hart
 Ziegfeld Follies of 1936 (New York concert cast, 1999) Roles originated by Gertrude Niesen
 Chicago (Broadway cast, 1999) as Velma Kelly
 Putting It Together (Broadway revival, 1999) as The Younger Woman
 The Vagina Monologues (Original Off-Broadway production, 2000)
 Miss Saigon (Broadway cast), (Broadway cast replacement, 31 December 2000 – 28 January 2001) as Ellen
 Peggy Sue Got Married (Original London Production, 2001) as Peggy Sue
 The Vagina Monologues (London cast, 2001–2002)
 The Boy from Oz (New York workshop, 2002) as Liza Minnelli
 Chicago (London cast, 2003) Velma Kelly
 Fosse (UK Tour, 2003)
 The Woman in White (Original London production, 2004–2005) as Marian
 The Other Woman (Ensemble Studio Theatre, New York, 2006) as Emma
 Stairway to Paradise (New York City Center, 2007)
 Marguerite (Original London production, 2008) as Marguerite
 Chicago (Cambridge Theatre, 2009) as Roxie Hart
 Blithe Spirit (Apollo Theatre, 2011) as Elvira
 Side by Side by Sondheim (Theatre Royal, Sydney, 2012) Headliner
Guys and Dolls (Concert version, Cadogan Hall, 2012) as Adelaide
 Billy Elliot (West End cast, Victoria Palace Theatre, 2014–2016) as Mrs.Wilkinson
 Chicago (West End revival, Phoenix Theatre, 2018) as Mama Morton
 Children Of Eden (30th anniversary concert, Cadogan Hall, 2021) as The Snake
 Passion (Hope Mill Theatre, revival, 2022) as Fosca

Olivier nominations
Henshall has been nominated five times for the UK's most prestigious theatre award, the Laurence Olivier Award, winning once.
1993 Best Actress in a Musical for Crazy for You – nominated
1995 Best Actress in a Musical for She Loves Me – won
1998 Best Actress in a Musical for Chicago – nominated
2002 Best Actress in a Musical for Peggy Sue Got Married – nominated
2009 Best Actress in a Musical for Marguerite – nominated

Publications

Discography

Solo albums
 I've Loved these Days
 The Ruthie Henshall Album
 Pilgrim
 Ruthie Henshall Sings Gershwin

Guest vocals and compilations
I Love Musicals
Sondheim – The Stephen Sondheim Album
Showstoppers: Dudu Fisher
Brent Barrett: The Kander and Ebb Album

Cast recordings
 1991: Children of Eden (Original London cast)
 1993: Crazy for You (Original London cast)
 1994: She Loves Me (1994 London revival cast)
 1995: Miss Saigon (1995 studio cast)
 1995: Les Misérables 10th Anniversary Concert
 1997: Godspell (1993 London studio cast)
 1998: She Loves Me (1994 London cast)
 1998: Divorce Me, Darling! (1997 Chichester cast)
 1998: Annie (London studio cast)
 1998: Chicago – The Musical (1998 London cast)
 1998: Hey, Mr. Producer!
 1999: Miss Saigon (1995 studio cast – highlights)
 2001: Ziegfeld Follies of 1936
 2004: A Christmas Carol (Original soundtrack from the Hallmark TV production)
 2008: Marguerite (Original London cast recording)

References

External links
 
 
 
 
 Behind the Stage Door with Ruthie Henshall on Magic at the Musicals
 In the Spotlight with Ruthie Henshall on Magic at the Musicals

1967 births
20th-century English actresses
21st-century English actresses
Actresses from Kent
English female dancers
English musical theatre actresses
Laurence Olivier Award winners
Living people
Musicians from Kent
People from Bromley
I'm a Celebrity...Get Me Out of Here! (British TV series) participants